Wharariki Ecosanctuary is a wildlife sanctuary within a predator-proof fence at Cape Farewell, New Zealand.

Location
The Wharariki Ecosanctuary is located on a headland on the Wharariki coastline at Cape Farewell. It is sited on conservation land that is managed as the Puponga Farm Park.

Establishment
One of the key drivers of this project is Peter Butler, who created a trust in 2017 to protect local wildlife in the region from Wharariki Beach to the tip of Farewell Spit. The Farewell Wharariki HealthPost Nature Trust was registered as a Charitable Trust in May 2021.

The sanctuary has been created in a collaborative project between Collingwood-based HealthPost Nature Trust, the Department of Conservation and Manawhenua ki Mōhua, representing Ngāti Tama, Te Ātiawa and Ngāti Rārua in the Golden Bay/ Mohua area. Starting in September 2019, a  predator-proof fence was constructed above the cliffs at Wharariki, enclosing . The fence was completed in January 2020. 

Prior to the translocation of burrow-nesting seabirds, the area was prepared by building artificial burrows, trapping pests and planting around the site.

In the Sustainable Business Awards 2021, HealthPost received a commendation in the Restoring Nature Award category, for their work in developing the ecosanctuary.

Translocation of fluttering shearwaters

In January 2022, 50 fluttering shearwater (Puffinus gavia) or  chicks were translocated from the Long Island – Kokomohua Marine Reserve in Queen Charlotte Sound to the Wharariki Ecosanctuary. They were the first species to be introduced to the fenced sanctuary.

In January 2023, another 53 fluttering shearwater chicks were translocated from the Long Island – Kokomohua Marine Reserve to the Wharariki Ecosanctuary. They were transferred due to weather events impacting their burrows on Long Island. It is hoped they will establish a breeding colony.

References

External links

 HealthPost Nature Trust

Golden Bay
Tasman District
Nature reserves in New Zealand
Wildlife sanctuaries of New Zealand